Missouri Route 73 is a short state highway in southwest Missouri. It runs from an intersection with U.S. Route 65 in the northern part of Buffalo in Dallas County to U.S. Route 54 near Macks Creek in Camden County. The route is two lanes for its entire length.

Route description
Route 73 begins at U.S. Route 65 in the northern tip of the town of Buffalo in Dallas County. It runs east for a short time before turning to the northeast and intersecting Route DD. The highway heads farther northeast and meets Route 64 in Pumpkin Center. North of the Route 64 intersection, the highway runs through Tunas. In Tunas, Route 73 intersects Routes D and E. Farther northeast, the route meets Route PP before crossing into Camden County.

In Camden County, Route 73 heads through the Branch Towersite and the town of Branch. It then ends at U.S. Route 54 southwest of Macks Creek.

No portion of Route 73 is a part of the National Highway System, a system of highways important to the nation's defense, economy, and mobility.

History
Before the U.S. Highway system was established, Route 73 was part of Route 15. In 1926, a significant part of Route 15 became U.S. Route 54, including the section that is today Route 73. Sometime between 1932 and 1935, US 54 was realigned to the north (switching places with Route 64), rejoining its old alignment west of Macks Creek. The diagonal section cut off between Buffalo and Macks Creek became Route 73.

Junction list

References

073
Transportation in Dallas County, Missouri
Transportation in Camden County, Missouri